"Beach Girl" is a song by Pat Boone that reached number 72 on the Bllboard Hot 100 in 1964.

Track listing

Charts

References 

1964 songs
1964 singles
Pat Boone songs
Dot Records singles